Milis, Miris or Milis in sardinian language,  is a comune (municipality) in the Province of Oristano in the Italian region Sardinia, located about  northwest of Cagliari and about  north of Oristano.

Milis borders the following municipalities: Narbolia, Bauladu, Bonarcado, San Vero Milis, Seneghe, Tramatza.

Demographic evolution

References

Cities and towns in Sardinia